Castagnole Monferrato is a comune (municipality) in the Province of Asti in the Italian region Piedmont, located about  east of Turin and about  northeast of Asti.

References

Cities and towns in Piedmont